David A. Wiley is an American academic, writer who is the chief academic officer of Lumen Learning, education fellow at Creative Commons, and former adjunct faculty of instructional psychology and technology at Brigham Young University, where he was previously an associate professor.
Wiley's work on open content, open educational resources, and informal online learning communities has been reported in many international outlets, including The New York Times, The Hindu, MIT Technology Review, and Wired.

Early life and education 
Wiley is originally from Barboursville, West Virginia, where he received his undergraduate degree in vocal performance from Marshall University in 1997. He later earned his doctoral degree in instructional psychology and technology from Brigham Young University in 2000.

Career 
In 1998 by Wiley initiated the Open Content Project for evangelizing open content with the Open Publication License. In 2003 Wiley announced, the Open Content Project has been succeeded by Creative Commons, where he joined as "Director of Educational Licenses".

He was also chief openness officer of Flat World Knowledge in 2007, founder of the Open High School of Utah, and was associate professor of instructional technology for the McKay School of Education, and founder and director of the Center for Open and Sustainable Learning (COSL), at Utah State University. He has received the National Science Foundation's CAREER award and served as a nonresident fellow of the Center for Internet and Society at Stanford Law School. Fast Company rated Wiley #78 in a list of the top 100 creative people for 2009. Wiley was also named a Peery Social Entrepreneurship Fellow in the Marriott School of Business in 2012. He was awarded the Ashoka Fellowship in 2017 for his work.

Center for Open and Sustainable Learning

The Center for Open and Sustainable Learning (COSL) operates on the principle that "free and open access to educational opportunity is a basic human right". Because it is getting easier to develop and distribute electronic tools around the globe, COSL sees the use of learning objects as a way to bring "open education" to all areas in an effort to fulfill "a greater ethical obligation than ever before to increase the reach of opportunity".

Reusability and learning objects

Wiley's early work focused on the design and development of learning objects. On one website, reusability.org, he explains that learning objects are developed to be reused as a solution to the problem of "teacher bandwidth". The "teacher bandwidth" problem is defined as "the number of students we are capable of serving with our distance education offerings".

Writings
From 2001 to 2004, Wiley wrote a column in the Association for Educational Communications and Technology (AECT) academic journal TechTrends entitled "Back Burner."

Wiley's 10 most influential publications, as ranked by Google Scholar, are:

 Connecting learning objects to instructional design theory D Wiley, 2000
 Instructional use of learning objects (D Wiley, 2000)
 Learning object design and sequencing theory (D Wiley, 2000)
 Learning objects (D Wiley, 2001)
 Using weblogs in scholarship and teaching (T Martindale, DA Wiley, 2004)
 Online Self-organizing Social Systems (DA Wiley, EK Edwards, 2002)
 Exploring research on internet-based learning: From infrastructure to interactions (JR Hill, D Wiley, LM Nelson, S Han, 2004)
 Open content and open educational resources: Enabling universal education (T Caswell, S Henson, M Jensen, D Wiley, 2008)
 On the sustainability of open educational resource initiatives in higher education (D Wiley, 2006)
 A non-authoritative educational metadata ontology for filtering and recommending learning objects (MM Recker, DA Wiley)

Many of Wiley's publications are available from the BYU institutional repository, Scholars Archive.

References

External links 

 
 David Wiley's blog
 David Wiley's Twitter
  David Wiley's profile on mormon.org
 The Open High School of Utah

Living people
Brigham Young University alumni
Marshall University alumni
Utah State University faculty
Stanford University people
Brigham Young University faculty
Copyright activists
Open content activists
Year of birth missing (living people)
Ashoka Fellows
Ashoka USA Fellows
People from Barboursville, West Virginia